The Simeulue scops owl (Otus umbra) is an owl species endemic to the island of Simeulue, Indonesia.

References

External links

 
 
 
 
 

Simeulue scops owl
Birds of Sumatra
Simeulue scops owl
Simeulue scops owl